As a response to an Israeli attack against a military convoy comprising Hezbollah and Iranian officers on January 18, 2015 at Quneitra in southern Syria, the Lebanese Hezbollah group launched an ambush on January 28 against an Israeli military convoy in the Israeli-occupied Shebaa Farms, firing anti-tank missiles against two Israeli Humvees patrolling the border, destroying the two Humvees and killing 2 and wounding 7 Israeli soldiers, according to Israeli military. The number of Israeli casualties was 15 according to a report by Al Mayadeen television station. A Spanish UN peacekeeper was also killed by Israeli fire during consequent fire exchanges in the area, with Israel firing artillery and Hezbollah responding by mortar shells. The conflict ended later the same day after UNIFIL mediation.

Background
During the Syrian Civil War, Hezbollah has had an increasing presence in southern Syria. Israel was accused of launching several airstrikes against Hezbollah and Syrian Army targets in southern Syria during the civil war, though it denied involvement. Hezbollah leader Hassan Nasrullah had warned that it would retaliate against Israeli attacks against Hezbollah inside Syria.

On January 18, 2015, an airstrike was launched against a convoy, killing six Hezbollah militants, including two prominent members and Iranian Revolutionary Guards general Mohammad Ali Allahdadi, at al-Amal Farms (Mazraat Amal) in the Quneitra District of Syria, in the Golan Heights. Hezbollah and IRGC held Israel responsible and threatened to retaliate. Amid official Israeli silence, a flurry of statements from anonymous Israeli officials made contradictory claims, one saying that Israel believed it was attacking only low-ranking Hezbollah militants planning an attack on Israelis at the frontier fence. One Israeli official reportedly apologised anonymously.

On January 27, at least two rockets from Syria hit the Israeli-occupied Golan Heights, and Israel responded with airstrikes and 20 artillery shells against Syrian army artillery positions. A senior IDF official held Hezbollah responsible.

Attack
On January 28, 2015, at 11:25am (UTC+02:00), a Hezbollah unit, "al-Quneitra Martyrs' group" (a reference to the attack in Quneitra against a Hezbollah convoy), comprising five militants, fired anti-tank missiles (supposedly 9M133 Kornet) at two Humvees of an Israeli military convoy of 432nd "Tsabar" Infantry Battalion of the Givati Brigade in the Israeli-occupied Shebaa Farms near the Lebanon border. Hezbollah immediately issued a brief statement claiming responsibility for the attack. A Lebanese army spokesman later said the missile was not fired from Lebanese territory.

Two hours after the initial attack, Israel fired at least 50 artillery shells into Shebaa Farms and the surrounding hills and South Lebanese border villages, and Israeli warplanes carried out mock air raids over the scene of the attack. Hezbollah responded with mortar shells against Israeli positions in the Shebaa farms area along the Golan Heights-Lebanon border.

Commander of the UNIFIL forces Major General Luciano Portolano called for restraint from all parties in order to prevent escalation. Shelling ceased around 2 pm, although Israeli warplanes hovered overhead.

Aftermath
The Hezbollah attack on the Israeli convoy at Shebaa farms killed two and wounded seven Israeli soldiers, according to the Israeli military. The IDF identified the victims as Sergeant Dor Chaim Nini, 20, and Captain Yochai Kalangel, 25. Al Mayadeen satellite channel said that fifteen soldiers had been killed in the attack.

A Spanish UN peacekeeper, Cpl. Francisco Javier Soria Toledo, was killed by Israeli fire; Israel acknowledged this but said that it had no intentions to harm UN troops.

Flights were suspended at the Israeli airports in Rosh Pina and Haifa. In Beirut, celebratory gunfire could be heard the afternoon after the attack.

According to Robert Tait in The Telegraph, Israel stood on the brink of all-out conflict with Hezbollah by performing air and ground strikes against it in retaliation for the incident, though while things were tense neither side was interested in further escalation. No Israeli reserve soldiers were mobilized, thus indicating that an "all-out conflict" was out of the question.

References

Attacks in Asia in 2015
Battles involving Hezbollah
Hezbollah–Israel conflict
Iran–Israel proxy conflict
Golan Heights